Ardre may refer to:

 Ardre (river), a fifth order river in France
 Ardre, Gotland, a settlement in Sweden
 10130 Ardre, a main-belt asteroid
 Ardre image stones, a collection of Viking rune and image stones

See also 
 Ardres, a commune I France